DeVos Fieldhouse is a 3,400-seat indoor arena in Holland, Michigan.  It was built in 2005, at a cost of $22 million.  It is home to Hope College's men's and women's basketball teams, the Hope Flying Dutchmen and the Hope Flying Dutch and Hope College's volleyball team.

It is also used for other events.  As a concert venue it can seat up to 4000 for end-stage shows and up to 4600 for center-stage shows; both are capacities of the largest theaters of metropolitan areas of the Grand Rapids area's population size.  It is also used for graduations, conferences and other special events.

External links
DeVos Fieldhouse

Basketball venues in Michigan
Indoor arenas in Michigan
Sports venues in Michigan
Sports venues completed in 2005
Music venues completed in 2005